Hakea verrucosa is a flowering plant in the family Proteaceae that is endemic to south-west Western Australia. It has large white, deep pink or red pendulous flowers with stiff needle-shaped leaves.

Description
The branchlets are covered mostly in densely matted, short, rusty hairs. The leaves are smooth and have a tendency to point in one direction from the branchlet. The pendant inflorescence consists of 7-14 white, pink to red flowers in a showy profusion in axillary clusters, or on old wood.

Taxonomy and naming
The species was first formally described in 1865 by Victorian Government Botanist Ferdinand von Mueller and published in the fifth volume of his Fragmenta Phytographiae Australiae.  Named from the Latin verrucosus - warty, referring to the seed surface.

Distribution and habitat

Hakea verrucosa grows in heath and low woodland on sandy-loam, near creeks, clay and gravel ranging from Jerramungup along the coast to Esperance.

Uses in horticulture
A frost-tolerant species that requires a well-drained site.  Due to its dense prickly growth habit a good wildlife habitat and low windbreak.

Conservation status
Hakea verrucosa is classified as "not threatened" by the Western Australian Government. Department of Parks and Wildlife.

References

verrucosa
Eudicots of Western Australia
Taxa named by Ferdinand von Mueller
Plants described in 1865